JinJoo Lee (born November 15, 1987) is a Korean–American musician and singer. She is best known as the guitarist for the pop rock band DNCE.

Life and career

Early life 
JinJoo Lee was born in Incheon, South Korea on November 15, 1987. Lee taught herself to play guitar at the age of 12, to join her family's band as the guitarist. She moved to Los Angeles at 19, where she learned English and attended the Musicians Institute in Hollywood. She is the sister-in-law of gospel singer Sohyang.

Career 
Lee has performed with JoJo, the Jonas Brothers, Charli XCX, Jordin Sparks, and CeeLo Green's all-female backing band, Scarlet Fever in 2010-11. She is the guitarist for the band DNCE which debuted in 2015.

DNCE 
Lee met Joe Jonas in 2009, when touring with the Jonas Brothers. She was the only female in the band, and when asked about it said, "It's the best thing ever...because they are very simple. Guys are so simple and easy. I don't know, I love working with guys. It's always been like that for my career. I was the only female in the band the entire time, so I'm very used to it. I'm very comfortable, and they're funny and silly."

References 

1987 births
American pop guitarists
American rock guitarists
South Korean pop guitarists
South Korean rock guitarists
Living people
South Korean emigrants to the United States
Musicians from Incheon
Scarlet Fever (band) members
DNCE members
21st-century American women guitarists
21st-century American guitarists
Jonas Brothers members